William Turner (16 November 1901 – 1989) was an English, retired professional footballer who played mainly as a midfielder or inside forward. He made 281 League appearances for Crystal Palace scoring 36 goals. He also played non-league football for Bromsgrove Rovers and Worcester City F.C.

Playing career
Turner began his career with Bromsgrove Rovers but had already become an England schoolboy international before signing for the club. He signed for Crystal Palace on 4 May 1925 and became a regular in the side the following season. Over the next 11 seasons, Turner made 281 league appearances for Palace, scoring 36 goals and became noted for his committed performances and versatility, playing in eight different positions. His nickname amongst the club's supporters was "Rubber".
In June 1936, Turner moved back into non-league football when he signed for Worcester City where he finished his playing career.

Bill Turner died in 1989 aged 87 or 88.

References

External links
Bill Turner at holmesdale.net

1901 births
1989 deaths
English footballers
Association football midfielders
English Football League players
Sportspeople from Tipton
Bromsgrove Rovers F.C. players
Crystal Palace F.C. players
Worcester City F.C. players